Love potion may refer to:

 Love potion (fictional drink), in mythology and fiction, a type of potion designed to create feelings of love
 Lappish Hag's Love Potion, an alcoholic drink
 The Love Potion, a 1903 painting by Evelyn De Morgan
 Aphrodisiac, a substance made with or containing ingredients that increase sexual desire
 "Love Potion" (song), by Alisa Mizuki, 2002

See also
 Love Potion No. 9 (disambiguation)
 Date rape drug